Rolly is a masculine given name and nickname (often for Roland or Rolland) which may refer to:

People
 Rolly Bester (1917-1984), radio personality (noted as first voice of Lois Lane) and wife of science fiction author Alfred Bester
 Rolly Crump (born 1930), American animator and designer
 Rolly Jayewardene (1918–1999), Sri Lankan physician
 Rolly Lumbala (born 1986), Canadian Football League player 
 Rolly Roulston (1911–1983), Canadian National Hockey League player
 Rolly Tasker (1926–2012), Australian Olympic sailor
 Rolly Teranishi (born 1963), Japanese musician, actor and music producer
 Rolly Xipu (born 1952), South African boxer

Fictional characters
 Rolly Forbes, on the TV series Amen
 a character on the animated children's TV series Puppy Dog Pals
 Rolly (Dalmatian), a character in the Disney movie One Hundred and One Dalmatians

Other uses
 Rolly Pistoia, Italian professional basketball team
 Sony Rolly, a digital audioplayer
 Typhoon Rolly, a typhoon name used in the Philippines by PAGASA

See also
 Rollie, a nickname
 

Lists of people by nickname
Hypocorisms